Sinonympha  is a monotypic butterfly genus in the family Nymphalidae (subfamily Satyrinae). The genus contains the single species Sinonympha amoena, which is found only in western China.

Synonymy
Sinonympha avinoffi (Schaus, 1927) is conspecific and has date priority.

References

"Sinonympha Lee, 1974" at Markku Savela's Lepidoptera and Some Other Life Forms

External links
Images representing Sinonympha amoena at Consortium for the Barcode of Life

Satyrinae
Monotypic butterfly genera
Butterflies described in 1974